StarBeam is a superhero animated streaming television series created for Netflix by Loris Lunsford and Jason Netter. The show follows Zoey (voiced by Nahanni Mitchell), a young girl who is a superhero.

The first season of the series premiered on Netflix on April 3, 2020, followed by a second season on September 8, 2020. A third season debuted on a March 9, 2021 release. Season 4 debuted on June 29, 2021, introducing a new format in the last few episodes.

A Halloween special, StarBeam: Halloween Hero, was released on October 6, 2020.

A New Years' special, StarBeam: Beaming in the New Year, was released on December 14, 2021.

Synopsis 
The show is based on Zoey, a girl in second grade. StarBeam, a superhero with unusual powers, including super-speed, super-strength, flight, high-velocity wind breathing, and the power to build force fields with bubbles, is Zoey's alter-ego. With her catchphrase, "It's time to shine!" Zoey turns into StarBeam. Zoey inherited her superpowers from her superhero mother, WonderBeam, and follows the theme of family superheroes.

Only a few people are aware of her hidden existence in Zoey's world. These individuals include her "Gramps" non-superpower grandfather; her closest friend, Henry, a "Boost" superhero who invents devices that strengthen his superhero abilities; and a friend who gives moral encouragement, their seagull sidekick, "Kipper." Gramps, Boost, and Kipper, together, always assist Zoey to save the day.

Characters 
 Zoey/StarBeam: The main heroine. Typically energetic and strong-willed, Zoey is very playful and excitable, though she doesn't like snails due to their slow and slimy nature. StarBeam's powers are bubble-based, though she also has super breath in addition to flight, super strength, and super speed. StarBeam's suit has also changed appearances depending on the mission, from manifesting as a spacesuit to giving her a mermaid tail for underwater missions.
 Henry Blumenshine/Boost: The secondary main character and Zoey’s best friend. Henry is the son of Mayor Blumenshine, who is unaware of his superhero identity as much as Zoey's. Henry is relatively more scientific and down to earth than Zoey, but he does enjoy much of the same activities that she likes. Unlike StarBeam, Boost lacks natural superpowers, including super strength and flight, and instead uses a menagerie of high-tech gadgets and inventions to assist any way he can.
 Gramps: The fourth main character and the father of Zoey's mother, as well as Zoey's grandfather. Gramps lacks any superpowers compared to Zoey and her mom, but his main role is mission control; he works in Beam Control at the lighthouse to watch for villains and other emergencies. Gramps has a calming presence, and gives Zoey words of wisdom when things get hairy in a mission. In his downtime, he enjoys fishing at the dock outside. Although he lacks natural superpowers, like Boost he makes use of a high-tech suit as a superhero, first doing so in the New Years' special.
 Kipper: The third main character and the only one other than Zoey and Henry to appear in every episode. Kipper is a seagull with the attitude of glutton who hangs around the lighthouse, being the pet-like resident of Zoey's household. Much like Gramps, he has no superpowers, but he does accompany StarBeam on her missions. Kipper is notably food-minded, as his primary motive, aside from helping StarBeam, is to constantly snack on miscellaneous foodstuffs, which can get him and/or the mission in big trouble.
 Zoey's Mom/WonderBeam: The fifth main character and Zoey's mother as well as Gramps' daughter. Zoey's mom cares very much about her family, but like Zoey, she is dedicated to her duty as a superheroine. She shares StarBeam's powers of super strength, super speed and flight, but she uses more laser-derived superpowers in contrast to StarBeam's bubbles, including a laser cage that renders all superpowers unusable. WonderBeam is the least recurring main character, only showing up in a handful of episodes per season.
 Captain Fishbeard: An overweight pirate who, much like a few species of birds, kleptomaniacally takes whatever shiny objects he sees, no matter how worthless much of them are. Fishbeard captains a flying pirate ship known as the Delores, and he has a gecko named Leonard instead of a parrot as with most pirates. Rather than a typical pirate accent, he uses a hoarse American accent whenever he speaks. Fishbeard appears the most out of the current villains, showing up in most of the episodes and the Halloween special.
 Miserable Marla: A blue-skinned girl with freckles and generally drab clothing. True to her name, Marla acts miserable when others are enjoying themselves, and she delights in spreading misery to the citizens of Somerset. Marla can levitate in mid-air, and while capable of generating wind, she primarily controls cloud-based weather, namely rain, snow or lightning as well as static electricity. She is sometimes accompanied by a number of sentient storm clouds, but she otherwise goes solo in her schemes. Marla appears a few episodes short of matching Captain Fishbeard.
 Cosmic Crusher: A large muscular man. Crusher is highly arrogant and believes himself to be the best dancer in all of Somerset, usually arriving to a captive audience. Twice however, his defeat comes from his overconfidence, which allows StarBeam and Boost to outsmart and defeat him. Cosmic Crusher has super strength and advanced dance moves, but his ego often hampers his performance. He only appears once in every season, and appears the least frequently as he's so far only appeared thrice.
 Ms. Winkleman: A teacher at the school where Henry and Zoey attend.
 Mayor Blumenshine: The mayor of Somerset and the mother of Henry/Boost. As with much of the other characters, Blumenshine is unaware of Henry and Zoey's superhero identities, but she does appreciate their help to a great extent. Her name is a pun on the words "bloom and shine".
 Luna Diaz: An astronaut who works for an unknown space program in Somerset. Diaz was a local hero of the Somerset citizens, and she researched the possibilities of growing plants in outer space.
 Ms. Fawkes: A photographer who takes pictures for the local school.
 Goop: A green and purple three-eyed alien-like being who appeared sporadically throughout the series (mostly under the servitude of his master Todd). He is idiotically ditzy and partially go-lucky, but he is loyal and enjoys helping his boss, though he is a bit of a coward. Goop is able to transform his body into many different forms, though a focused beam of light can force him back into his true shape.
 Todd: A short purple being in a black and yellow outfit whole is widely known to Zoey's family as the most troublesome villain in all of Somerset's knowledge. Todd is extremely mad and dramatic, though while he is malicious, he is always foiled due to some of his drawbacks, abusing his servant Goop being among them. Todd's primary (and seemingly only) superpower is his ability to grow at will, though he can often get arrogant when doing so. He only appeared via mentions or through communication windows between him and Goop, but debuted in person during the Season 3 premiere.
 Tricksy the Pixie: A mischievous fairy who enjoys causing problems around Somerset. Tricksy has arachnophobia but delights in playing pranks in peaceful environments, ranging from switching trail signs to swapping a hot dog for a snail. She often revels in her tricks, but has shown sympathy in her debut. She affectionately refers to her magic wand as "Wanda", and often leaves with a good laugh. Tricksy only reverses the effects of her pranks after somebody pranks her back. She was introduced in Season 3.
 Stella: A young redhead girl with glasses, pigtails and braces who is one of Zoey and Henry's classmates and friends. Stella is known to everyone else as a huge StarBeam superfan, even crafting herself a costume based on StarBeam's uniform. 
 Greta and Gunther: Classmates of Zoey and Henry who are twins.
 Zak: Zoey and Henry's paraplegic classmate.
 Zara: A new character debuting in the New Years' special. She is Zoey's cousin. Like Gramps and Boost, her superhero identity uses a high-tech suit.
 Mystery Villain: An unknown character who hired Cosmic Crusher, Fishbeard, and Miserable Marla to sabotage the New Year.

Cast

 Nahanni Mitchell as Zoey (aka, the superhero StarBeam)
 Dean Petriw as Henry Blumenshine (aka, the superhero Boost)
 Sam Vincent as Kipper and Captain Fishbeard
 Terry Klassen as Gramps
 Diana Kaarina as Zoey's Mom (aka, the superhero WonderBeam) and Tricksy
 Laara Sadiq
 Maryke Hendrikse as Miserable Marla
 Ed Hughes
 Jaeda Lily Miller
 Abigail Journey Oliver as Stella
 Rhona Rees as Mayor Blumenshine
 Zion Simpson
 Dominic Good
 Sarah Almonte Peguero
 Vincent Tong as Cosmic Crusher
 Mayumi Yoshida
 Sasha Duncan
 Dee See Four One Four
 Shannon Chan-Kent as Mystery Villain

Episodes

Season 1 (2020)

Season 2 (2020)

Season 3 (2021)

Season 4 (2021)

StarBeam Shorts (2021)
Unusually, instead of being uploaded to the Netflix Jr. YouTube channel, the shorts are instead placed as episodes 9-16 of Season 4.

The first seven shorts are depicted as home movies made by Stella, a local of Somersette known as a StarBeam Superfan to everyone else. The last short is a music video featuring an extended version of the StarBeam theme song, previously uploaded to YouTube as a form of promotion for the series.

 Gonzo for Gadgets
 Meeting Marla
 A Day on the Delores
 Tricking Like Tricksy
 StarBeam Style
 Kipper Cam
 Family Pictures
 Time to Shine

Specials

Release
StarBeam was released on April 3, 2020. The series aired on Netflix.

References

External links
 

2020s Canadian animated television series
2020s Canadian children's television series
2020 Canadian television series debuts
2021 Canadian television series endings
2020 animated television series debuts
Canadian children's animated action television series
Canadian children's animated adventure television series
Canadian children's animated science fantasy television series
Canadian children's animated superhero television series
Canadian computer-animated television series
Canadian preschool education television series
Animated television series about children
English-language Netflix original programming
Netflix children's programming
Animated television series by Netflix
Animated preschool education television series
2020s preschool education television series